The Gathering is a 1977 American made-for-television movie about a dying executive who arranges a final Christmas reunion with his estranged wife and adult children. It was directed by Randal Kleiser and stars Edward Asner and Maureen Stapleton.

Plot 
Adam Thornton (Edward Asner), an ill-tempered executive who walked out on his family, learns that he only has a little time left to live. He decides that he wants to make peace with them and have one last reunion. He confides this information to his estranged wife, Kate (Maureen Stapleton). But when his doctor says that it won't be good for him to travel, she suggests that he should call his four adult children and invite them all for Christmas.

He agrees only with the provision that they not be told of his illness and imminent death. The only problem is that most of them are not exactly fond of him because he walked out on Kate and has a stubborn nature. Of them, he is most nervous about seeing Bud (Gregory Harrison), whom he hasn't spoken to since having an argument with him regarding the Vietnam War and his move to Canada several years before.

Cast 
 Edward Asner as Adam
 Maureen Stapleton as Kate
 Rebecca Balding as Julie
 Sarah Cunningham as Clara
 Bruce Davison as George
 Veronica Hamel as Helen
 Gregory Harrison as Bud Jr.
 James Karen as Bob Block
 Lawrence Pressman as Tom
 John Randolph as Dr. Hodges
 Gail Strickland as Peggy
 Edward Winter as Roger
 Stephanie Zimbalist as Toni

Sequel 
The film was followed by the 1979 sequel The Gathering, Part II, which picked up two years after Adam's death (Asner did not appear in it), and largely concerned Kate's relationship with a new man (Efrem Zimbalist Jr.).

Awards 
 Nomination for and won Emmy for Outstanding Special - Drama or Comedy
 Nomination for Emmy – Outstanding Art Direction for a Dramatic Special - Jan Scott (art director) Anne D. McCulley (set Director)
 Nomination for Emmy – Outstanding Directing in a Special Program - Drama or Comedy - Randal Kleiser
 Nomination for Emmy – Outstanding Lead Actress in a Drama or Comedy Special - Maureen Stapleton
 Nomination for Emmy – Outstanding Writing in a Special Program - Drama or Comedy - Original Teleplay - James Poe (writer)

Home media
The film was released on DVD Christmas 2009 by Warner Archive. This is a Manufacture-on-Demand (MOD) release, available through Warner's online store and Amazon.com.

See also 
 List of Christmas films

References

External links 
 
 
 The Gathering at Rotten Tomatoes.com

1977 films
1977 television films
1970s Christmas drama films
1970s Christmas films
ABC network original films
American Christmas drama films
American television films
Christmas television films
Films about death
Films about dysfunctional families
Films directed by Randal Kleiser
Films set in Cleveland
Films shot in Ohio
Films with screenplays by James Poe
Hanna-Barbera films
1970s English-language films
1970s American films